FK Naša Krila Zemun (Cyrillic: ФК Haшa кpилa Зeмун) was a football club based in Zemun, Serbia.

It existed for a short period between its foundation, in 1947, and 1950.

History
The club was formed by the Yugoslav Air Force soon after the end of World War II. It competed in the Yugoslav League system. They played the season 1947-48 in the Second League and finished third, this way earning promotion to the Yugoslav First League. The first season in the national top league, 1948-49, the club managed to finish in 5h place. Next season, in 1950, the club finishes 6th, but at the end of the season it ended up being disbanded.

The club has participated in the inaugural edition of the Yugoslav Cup in its first year of existence and managed to reach the Cup final, played in 1947 in Belgrade in JNA Stadium in front of 50,000 people, where they lost against FK Partizan by 0-2. Next year, 1948, the club reached the semi-finals, where they lost against Red Star Belgrade by 3-4. In 1949 the club once more reached the final, losing again, this time against Red Star by 2-3.

Notable teams
The team that played the cup final in 1947 was formed by:
Players: Popadić, Lazić, Filipović (captain), Grčić, Brnjevarac, Lokošek, Panić, Pečenčić, Zlatković, Damnjanović and Borovic.
Head coach: N. Radosavljević.

The team that played the cup final in 1949 was formed by:
Players: Popadić, Filipović, Jovanović, Kobe, Zvekanović, Adamović, Panić, Grčić, Popović, Zlatković and Borovic.
Head coach: N. Radosavljević.

References

External sources
 Club profile  at Foot.dk.
 Club profile at fkvojvodina.com

Football clubs in Yugoslavia
Association football clubs established in 1947
Association football clubs disestablished in 1950
Football clubs in Belgrade
1947 establishments in Serbia
1950 disestablishments in Serbia
Sport in Zemun